Governor Daly may refer to:

Dominick Daly (1798–1868), Governor of Prince Edward Island from 1854 to 1859 and Governor of South Australia from 1862 to 1868
Henry Daly (1823–1895), Governor General of India from 1870 to 1881